The 2000 Danish Figure Skating Championships was held in Hørsholm from January 14 to 16, 2000. Skaters competed in the disciplines of men's singles and ladies' singles. Not all disciplines were held on all levels due to a lack of participants.

Senior results

Men

Ladies

External links
 results

Danish Figure Skating Championships
Danish Figure Skating Championships, 2000
Figure Skating Championships